Colin Roberts Scotts (born 26 April 1963) is an Australian former American football player; he was the first Australian to receive an American football scholarship in the United States and be drafted into the NFL. He became the second Australian to play in the NFL after Colin Ridgeway, an Australian rules football convert.

Growing up in Palm Beach, Sydney, Scotts first played rugby union for The Scots College and was a member of the undefeated 1981 Australian Schoolboys Rugby team. That group scored 48 tries and conceded just one while racking up wins over Ireland (24-0), Scotland (34-0) and Welsh Youth (13-9) in the three internationals. He later moved to Hawaii, on a full football scholarship after being spotted by an assistant coach during a rugby game. After being drafted in the third round of the 1987 NFL Draft, he forged a career in the NFL where he played as a defensive tackle in seven games during the 1987 season for the St. Louis Cardinals. 

1989 saw Scotts transfer to the Housten Oilers in what, at the time, was the highest valued contract for a defensive tackle player in history. He retired, because of injury, at the end of the 1989 season after playing 15 games. 

In 1993 Scotts commenced his professional wrestling career. 

Results came rapidly and soon Scotts was appearing in the big tournaments which attracted worldwide television coverage. He quickly gained a cult like group of international fans. 

Climbing quickly up the ranks Scotts was earning a reputation as a fierce competitor and respected commentators were singing his praises. A recurring NFL injury came back and in 1994 he was forced to quit wresting. The world will never know what heights he could have achieved.

Returning to Australia in 2000, Colin Scotts personal story is entertaining while providing an enlightening insight into human nature. Colin is an inspirational public speaker that has been in demand with the corporate world, government and even schools. He uses his experiences to show others how they can overcome hardship to succeed against the odds.

References

Australian players of American football
American football defensive tackles
St. Louis Cardinals (football) players
Hawaii Rainbow Warriors football players
Australian rugby union players
1963 births
Living people
Sportspeople from Sydney
People educated at Scots College (Sydney)
Footballers who switched code
Rugby union players that played in the NFL